The men's 4 km individual pursuit competition at the 2006 Asian Games was held on 9 and 10 December at the Aspire Hall 1.

Schedule
All times are Arabia Standard Time (UTC+03:00)

Records

Results
Legend
DSQ — Disqualified

Qualifying

Finals

Bronze

Gold

References

External links 
Results

Track Men individual pursuit